The spiny softshell turtle (Apalone spinifera) is a species of softshell turtle, one of the largest freshwater turtle species in North America. Both the common name, spiny softshell, and the specific name, spinifera (spine-bearing), refer to the spiny, cone-like projections on the leading edge of the carapace, which are not scutes (scales).

Description
The spiny softshell turtle's scientific name is very descriptive of the animal. Apalone comes from the Greek word apalos, meaning soft or tender, and spinifera is of Latin origin; spina- referring to thorn or spine and -ifer meaning bearing. This species is a member of the family Trionychidae, and one of the most distinguishing features of members in this family is the presence of a leathery, moderately flexible carapace. This is caused by loss of keratinized scutes and some bony tissue loss. Spiny softshell turtles have webbed feet, each with three claws. Another distinguishing feature of softshell turtles is the presence of a fleshy, elongated nose.

The carapace (the upper part of the shell) ranges from brown or yellow-brown to olive in color, while the plastron (lower part of the shell) is lighter, usually white or yellow. Hatchlings usually have dark spots on the carapace, but as females age, they frequently become darker in color, or their carapace becomes splotched. Males tend to maintain the same coloration pattern from birth. Coloration also varies between each subspecies, and the exact coloration can also depend on an individual turtle's environment. Spiny softshell turtles are cryptically colored, meaning that their coloration helps them blend in with their surrounding environment.

Spiny softshell turtles also have pale lines bordered by black lines running from its head down the side of its neck. The carapace length ranges from 18 to 54 cm, with females growing larger than males. The namesake spines are found along the anterior border of the carapace and are more commonly found in males. The variation in coloration, size, and spine presence indicates that this species exhibits sexual dimorphism.

Respiration
A. spinifera turtles are bimodal breathers, meaning they have the ability (to some degree) to perform oxygen and carbon dioxide exchange by breathing air or while breathing underwater. A variety of factors allow for these turtles to perform respiration underwater. They have an increase of cutaneous surface area and blood flow, reduction in lung size, and increase of respiratory epithelium in the cloaca and buccopharynx. Spiny softshell turtles are more dependent on underwater respiration than other freshwater species. This has led to their low tolerance of hypoxic waters; this becomes especially important during times of hibernation, when these turtles must choose hibernacula that are unlikely to become hypoxic. They are known as an "anoxia-intolerant" species because of their dependency on underwater respiration. Other turtle species are more adapted to variation in oxygen levels but A. spinifera are not able to regulate it as well, especially during hibernation periods. This makes choosing hibernacula very important to their over-winter survival. While they are susceptible to anoxia, they have the ability to maintain their metabolism completely via aerobic means which gives them a slight advantage when compared to other hibernating aquatic turtles during winter.

Geographic range
This species is the most widely distributed Trionychid in North America. The spiny softshell has a wide range, extending throughout much of the United States, as well as north into the Canadian provinces of Ontario and Quebec, and south into the Mexican states of Tamaulipas, Nuevo León, Coahuila and Chihuahua. As of recently, the spiny softshell has expanded its geographic range (through human assistance) into Washington State and California.

Ecological range
Spiny softshell turtles are often referred to as ecological generalists, meaning that they are found in a wide variety of habitats. The spiny softshell can be found in bodies of fresh water including ponds, lakes, rivers, tributaries, and streams. They inhabit shallow water (less than 1 m deep), but can also be found as far as 10 m deep. They can be found in areas with varying levels of vegetation, and although they are generally found in more slow-moving waters, this species abundance is greatest in waters with higher visibility and slower water velocity  Spiny softshells prefer waters with sandy bottoms and clean, sandy banks. Sandy environments are important for nesting sites, proper juvenile growth and development, and camouflage.
Spiny softshells migrate between warm and cold seasons. In each season, turtles generally stay in a single zone, and they move more within their zone during warm months. The spiny softshell will migrate between their zones and their average home range length is 10.8 km

As far as home range, a study of the “Eastern Spiny” subspecies (which has the largest and most northern-reaching distribution) home range behaviour found that turtles of northern Lake Champlain generally had 2 annual concentration areas for spring-summer and fall-winter, contributing to a large home range (Galois, 2002). Mean annual home range was also found, in the same study, to be over 10x larger for female softshells compared to males.

Diet
Spiny softshell turtles feed on a variety of food items. They are primary consumers and feed on invertebrates (crayfish and aquatic insects), fish, algal stocks and other plant material, and mussels. They are generally observed as benthic feeders; they can either actively hunt prey or bury themselves in the sand and wait to ambush prey.

Some evidence suggests that Spiny Softshell turtles exhibit a nuclear-follower foraging association with fish. A study that took place in an Urban Drainage Canal in Louisiana found that when foraging, Spiny Softshell turtles were observed moving along the creek bottom thrusting their probosces into the substrate which then allowed fish to enter the suspended sediment and capture prey otherwise unavailable to the fish. The fish benefit from increased foraging success, while few benefits accrue to the foraging turtles.

Taxonomy
The species was first described by Charles Alexandre Lesueur in 1827. It has been redescribed numerous times, leading to some confusion in its taxonomy. There are multiple subspecies recognized across North America; including the Eastern Spiny Softshell, Gulf Coast Spiny Softshell, Texas Spiny Softshell, Guadalupe Spiny Softshell, and the Pallid Spiny Softshell. The recognized subspecies differ in the markings on their carapaces, on the sides of their heads, and on their feet. These markings, which are distinct as hatchlings, fade as the turtles grow larger. Adult females of the various subspecies, which grow larger than males, are not easily distinguishable from one another, and sometimes can only be assigned to a particular subspecies based on geography.

Reproduction
Spiny softshells begin mating between ages 8 and 10. A large female turtle may live up to 50 years. The turtles mate in mid-to-late spring in deep water. The male will nudge the female's head while swimming, and if she chooses to mate, the male will swim above the female without clasping her with his claws (unlike other turtles). A few months later, the female turtle quickly lays her eggs along a sunny sandbar or gravel bank in a flask-shaped cavity she has dug close to the water. This nesting behavior typically begins around July with the females leaving the water and probing the ground with her snout to find the spot to lay her eggs. The turtle nests more than once during a single season. She can lay between 9 and 38 round, calcareous-shelled eggs. The eggs are laid around July and September, and they hatch in the spring. In studies observing nesting behavior, it has been found that the females are more likely to lay eggs on days where there is a small difference between the air and water temperatures. Unlike in other turtles, in the spiny softshell turtle, the sex of the hatchlings is not determined by temperature variations; it is determined by genetics. Although they are not listed on the IUCN Red List in the United States, they are listed as endangered in Canada. This is due to high predation on eggs and low hatchling survival rates.

Subspecies
Six subspecies of A. spinifera are recognized, including the nominate subspecies:

Northern spiny softshell turtle (or eastern spiny softshell), A. s. spinifera (Lesueur, 1827)
Gulf Coast spiny softshell turtle, A. s. aspera (Agassiz, 1857)
Black spiny softshell turtle or Cuatro Cienegas softshell turtle, A. s. atra (Webb & Legler, 1960)
Texas spiny softshell turtle, A. s. emoryi (Agassiz, 1857)
Guadalupe spiny softshell turtle, A. s. guadalupensis (Webb, 1962)
Pallid spiny softshell turtle, A. s. pallida (Webb, 1962)

A previously recognized subspecies, Apalone spinifera hartwegi (Conant & Goin, 1941), has been synonymized to A. s. spinifera as of 2011.

Genomics
A rough-draft assembly of the A. spinifera aspera genome was completed in 2013 by the Genome Institute at Washington University in St. Louis. The assembly ASM38561v1 can be accessed via its Genbank accession ID APJP00000000.1

Gallery

References

Bibliography

Further reading
Behler JL, King FW (1979). The Audubon Society Field Guide to North American Reptiles and Amphibians. New York: Alfred A. Knopf. 743 pp. . (Trionyx spiniferus, pp. 485–486 + Plates 270, 271).
Boulenger GA (1889). Catalogue of the Chelonians, Rhynchocephalians, and Crocodiles in the British Museum (Natural History). New Edition. London: Trustees of the British Museum (Natural History). (Taylor and Francis, printers). x + 311 pp. + Plates I-III. (Trionyx spinifer, pp. 259–260).
Lesueur CA (1827). "Note sur deux espèces de tortues, du genre Trionyx de M[onsieur]. Geoffroy-Saint-Hilaire ". Mémoires du Muséum d'Histoire Naturelle, Paris 15: 257-268 + Plates 6–7. (Trionyx spiniferus, new species, pp. 258–263 + Plate 6). (in French).
Smith HM, Brodie ED Jr (1982). Reptiles of North America: A Guide to Field Identification. New York: Golden Press. 240 pp. . (Trionyx spiniferus, pp. 31–33).
Stejneger L, Barbour T (1917). A Check List of North American Amphibians and Reptiles. Cambridge Massachusetts: Harvard University Press. 125 pp. (Amyda spinifera, p. 125).

External links
 Drawing of skull of Spiny Softshell Turtle

Apalone
Turtles of North America
Reptiles of the United States
Reptiles of Mexico
Fauna of the Eastern United States
Reptiles of Ontario
Reptiles described in 1827
Fauna of the Northwestern United States